St. Paul School District No. 48 was a school district headquartered in St. Paul, Arkansas.

On July 1, 2004, the St. Paul School District was merged into the Huntsville School District.

See also 
 St. Paul High School (Arkansas)
 St. Paul School Building

References

External links
 
 St. Paul School District No. 48  Madison County, Arkansas  General Purpose Financial Statements  and Other Reports June 30, 2002 

Education in Madison County, Arkansas
Defunct school districts in Arkansas
2004 disestablishments in Arkansas
School districts disestablished in 2004